Annette Turnbaugh is an American politician who started serving in the Missouri House of Representatives from the 37th district in 2021. A Democrat, she succeeded fellow Democrat Joe Runions.

Missouri House of Representatives

Committee assignments 

 Conservation and Natural Resources
 Rural Community Development
 Special Committee on Small Business

Source:

Electoral history

References 

Living people
21st-century American politicians
Democratic Party members of the Missouri House of Representatives
Year of birth missing (living people)
Women state legislators in Missouri
21st-century American women politicians